The 2. deild karla is the third tier of men's football in the Icelandic football league system, and the 2006 season was the 41st edition of the tournament. Fjarðabyggð won the league and were subsequently promoted to the 1. deild karla for the 2007 campaign. Njarðvík and Reynir Sandgerði, also won promotion after finishing second and third respectively. However, Huginn were relegated to the 3. deild karla after finishing bottom of the league.

Clubs

League table

Results grid
Each team played the other nine teams both home and away, resulting in a total of 90 matches.

Top goalscorers

Awards

Player of the year
The official 2. deild player of the year for 2006 was the Njarðvík defender Gestur Gylfason. The 37-year-old was a new signing for the 2006 season and his experience was a key factor in helping his team to achieve promotion to the 1. deild.

Young player of the year
Atli Heimisson, the 19-year-old Afturelding striker, was awarded the young player of the year award for 2006. He scored five goals in eleven matches during his second season of senior league football.

Manager of the year
Fjarðabyggð coach Þorvaldur Örlygsson was named 2. deild manager of the year for 2006. After being appointed in autumn 2005, he led the team to promotion during his first full campaign in charge, with his side losing only two matches in the league.

Team of the year

The KSÍ also selected a team of the year, which included the best 11 players and 5 substitutes.
Goalkeeper
Albert Sævarsson (Njarðvík) 
Defenders
Kristinn Björnsson (Njarðvík), Haukur Sigurbergsson (Fjarðabyggð), Andri Albertsson (Fjarðabyggð), Gestur Gylfason (Njarðvík)
Midfielders
Guðfinnur Ómarsson (ÍR), Guðni Erlendsson (Njarðvík), Ólafur Jónsson (Reynir Sandgerði), Sverrir Sverrisson (Njarðvík)
Forwards
Jeppe Opstrup (Huginn), Adolf Sveinsson (Reynir Sandgerði) 
Substitutes
Srdjan Rajkovic (Fjarðabyggð), Jóhann Benediktsson (Fjarðabyggð), Grétar Ómarsson (Fjarðabyggð), Marteinn Guðjónsson (Njarðvík), Ragnar Hauksson (KS/Leiftur)

References

2. deild karla seasons
Iceland
Iceland
3